Huntingdonshire was a Parliamentary constituency covering the county of Huntingdonshire in England. It was represented in the House of Commons of England until 1707, then in the House of Commons of Great Britain from 1707 to 1800, and then in the House of Commons the Parliament of the United Kingdom from 1801 to 1885. It returned two Knights of the Shire (apart from 1654 to 1659, when it returned three); when elections were contested, the bloc vote system was used.

Under the Redistribution of Seats Act 1885, it was divided between the new single-seat county divisions of Huntingdon and Ramsey with effect from the 1885 general election.

Under the Representation of the People Act 1918, Huntingdon and Ramsey were re-united and the constituency was reconstituted, returning a single Member of Parliament (MP). Subject to boundary changes for the 1983 general election, the constituency was succeeded by the re-established constituency of Huntingdon.  Its MP at the time, John Major, continued to represent it.

Boundaries
1918–1974: The administrative county of Huntingdonshire.

1974–1983: In 1965 Huntingdonshire was merged into the new administrative county of Huntingdon and Peterborough and in the next redistribution of parliamentary seats, which took effect for the February 1974 general election, the constituency was defined as comprising the Municipal Boroughs of Huntingdon and Godmanchester, and St Ives, the Urban Districts of Old Fletton, Ramsey, and St Neots, and the Rural Districts of Huntingdon, Norman Cross, St Ives, and St Neots.  Eaton Socon in Bedfordshire had been absorbed by the Urban District of St Neots and was transferred from the County Constituency of Mid Bedfordshire.  There were other marginal adjustments due to changes in county borders.

Meanwhile, as a result of the Local Government Act 1972, the two counties of Cambridgeshire and Isle of Ely, and Huntingdon and Peterborough were merged to form the non-metropolitan county of Cambridgeshire, with effect from 1 April 1974. However, the next redistribution did not come into effect until the 1983 general election, when the majority of the constituency, including Huntingdon, Godmanchester, Ramsey and St Ives, formed the bulk of the new County Constituency of Huntingdon. Areas to the south of the River Nene, including Fletton and the Ortons, which were now part of the expanded City of Peterborough, were transferred to the Borough Constituency of Peterborough. Southernmost areas, including St Neots, were transferred to the new County Constituency of South West Cambridgeshire.

Members of Parliament

 Constituency created (1290)

1290–1660

MPs 1660–1885

MPs 1918–1983

Elections

Elections in the 1830s

Elections in the 1840s

Elections in the 1850s
Thornhill's death caused a by-election.

 

 

Montagu succeeded to the peerage, becoming 7th Duke of Manchester and causing a by-election.

 
 

Securing the same number of votes, both Fellowes and Heathcote were returned alongside Rust as Members of Parliament. However, after scrutiny, Rust and Fellowes lost one vote, while Heathcote lost two, causing Heathcote to be declared unduly elected on 31 July 1857.

Elections in the 1860s

 

Montagu's appointment as Vice-President of the Committee of the Council on Education required a by-election.

Elections in the 1870s

 
 

Pelly's death caused a by-election.

Elections in the 1880s

Elections in the 1910s

Elections in the 1920s

Elections in the 1930s 

General Election 1939–40

Another General Election was required to take place before the end of 1940. The political parties had been making preparations for an election to take place and by the Autumn of 1939, the following candidates had been selected; 
Liberal National: Sidney Peters
Labour: James Lunnon

Elections in the 1940s

Elections in the 1950s

Elections in the 1960s

Elections in the 1970s 

:

See also 
 Parliamentary representation from Huntingdonshire
List of former United Kingdom Parliament constituencies
Unreformed House of Commons

Notes and references
Notes

References

Sources 

Politics of Huntingdonshire
Parliamentary constituencies in the East of England (historic)
Constituencies of the Parliament of the United Kingdom established in 1290
Constituencies of the Parliament of the United Kingdom disestablished in 1885
Constituencies of the Parliament of the United Kingdom established in 1918
Constituencies of the Parliament of the United Kingdom disestablished in 1983